Loris Facci (born 13 August 1983 in Torino) is a breaststroke swimmer from Italy, who won the on bronze medal in the men's 200 metres breaststroke event at the 2007 World Championships. He represented his native country at the 2004 Summer Olympics in Athens, Greece.

References
 Profile

1983 births
Living people
Italian male swimmers
Swimmers at the 2004 Summer Olympics
Swimmers at the 2008 Summer Olympics
Olympic swimmers of Italy
World Aquatics Championships medalists in swimming
Italian male breaststroke swimmers
20th-century Italian people
21st-century Italian people